Uzi Rubin (born 1937) is an Israeli defense engineer and analyst. Rubin is considered one of the pre-eminent analysts of missile systems in the Middle East.

Defense industry involvement

Uzi Rubin has been involved in Israeli military research, development, and engineering programs for almost forty years. Between 1991 and 1999, he served as head of Israel's Missile Defense Organization, and in that capacity he oversaw the development of Israel's Arrow anti-missile defense system. He was awarded the Israel Defense Prize in 1996. He is a fellow of the Begin-Sadat Center for Strategic Studies at Bar Ilan University.

See also
Jerusalem Institute for Strategy and Security, another institute Uzi Rubin is working for

References

External links
Rubin's article on Iraqi Missile systems

Israeli engineers
1957 births
Living people
Israel Defense Prize recipients